8 Persei is a single star in the northern constellation of Perseus, located 416 light years away from the Sun. It is visible to the naked eye as a dim, orange-hued star with an apparent visual magnitude of 5.757. There is an estimated 52% chance that the star may be a member of the Hyades–Pleiades stream of co-moving stars.

With an age of over two billion years, this is an aging red giant of spectral type K3 III, a star that has used up its core hydrogen and is expanding. It has 1.83 times the mass of the Sun and has reached nearly 16 times the Sun's size. The star is radiating 108 times the Sun's luminosity from its enlarged photosphere at an effective temperature of 4,560 K.

References

K-type giants
Perseus (constellation)
Durchmusterung objects
Persei, 08
013982
10718
0661